Robert M. Hopkins (November 3, 1934 – May 15, 2015) was an American basketball player and coach.

Biography 
A native of Jonesboro, La., Hopkins participated in football, basketball, baseball, and track (He was invited to participate in the 1956 Olympic Games as a broad jumper but declined in order to sign with the Syracuse Nationals.) Over the course of his career he achieved all-state honors in football (twice). basketball (twice) and baseball (four times). He's most noted for playing college basketball at Grambling State University, where he scored 3,759 points (averaging 29.8 points per game for his career). He was the first Grambling player to make an all-American basketball team and the school's first professional player. Hopkins was an all-conference selection at Grambling all four years and made all-American three times. Over the course of his career he held the NAIA records for most career points (3,759), field goals made (1,403), free throws made (953), and rebounds (12,191). Hopkins was college basketball's all-time leading scorer until 1972 when Travis Grant of Kentucky State University set the new record of 4,045 points. Hopkins then played in the National Basketball Association (NBA) for four seasons (1956–1960) with the Syracuse Nationals and then the Philadelphia Tapers (1960–1962), but his career was eventually cut short due to a leg injury.

In his first venture as head coach (1965–66) at Prairie View College, Hopkins' squad posted a 16–10 record and a second place finish in the Southwestern Athletic Conference (SAC). Moving next to Alcorn A&M (State) in Mississippi in 1966, Hopkins coached the Braves to three straight SAC championships, obtaining Coach of the Year honors following each season. His first two Alcorn teams participated in the national tournament at Kansas City, Mo. advancing to the second and third rounds respectively. In his third year, his team sported a 27–0 record before they were defeated in the finals of the NCAA College Division by Western Kentucky University. He was voted regional "Coach of the Year" during his last two years at Alcorn by the NAIA.

Hopkins next served as the head coach for Xavier University of Louisiana Gold Rush from 1969 to 1974, coaching future ABA and NBA stars Bruce Seals and "Slick" Watts. During his tenure, coach Hopkins led the team to 89 wins and 47 losses, four winning seasons, and two NAIA District 30 Championships, leading Xavier to the national NAIA Tournament in Kansas City for two consecutive years (1972 and 1973). He would next serve on Bill Russell's coaching staff with the Seattle SuperSonics and replaced Russell, his cousin, after the 1976–77 season. Hopkins posted a 5–17 record during the 1977–78 season before being fired; he was replaced by Lenny Wilkens, who led the Sonics to the NBA Finals that season and the following, winning the NBA championship in 1979.

Hopkins was inducted into the NAlA Hall of Fame in 1963, and elected into the College Basketball Hall of Fame in 2013.

He died of heart and kidney failure on May 15, 2015, and was his funeral was held at St Monica Catholic Church on Mercer Island.

References

External links
 BasketballReference.com: Bob Hopkins (as coach)
 BasketballReference.com: Bob Hopkins (as player)

1934 births
2015 deaths
African-American basketball players
Alcorn State Braves basketball coaches
American men's basketball coaches
American men's basketball players
Basketball coaches from Louisiana
Basketball players from Louisiana
Centers (basketball)
College men's basketball head coaches in the United States
Grambling State Tigers men's basketball coaches
Grambling State Tigers men's basketball players
Maryland Eastern Shore Hawks men's basketball coaches
National Collegiate Basketball Hall of Fame inductees
People from Jonesboro, Louisiana
Power forwards (basketball)
Prairie View A&M Panthers basketball coaches
Seattle SuperSonics head coaches
Southern Jaguars basketball coaches
Syracuse Nationals draft picks
Syracuse Nationals players
Xavier Gold Rush basketball coaches
African-American Catholics
20th-century African-American sportspeople
21st-century African-American people